Matías Raúl Villarreal (born 16 January 1992) is an Argentine professional footballer who plays as a midfielder for Gimnasia Mendoza.

Club career
Villarreal initially played in the youth system of Luján de Cuyo, prior to spending two years in the ranks of Deportivo Guaymallén. 2006 saw Villarreal head to Independiente Rivadavia, appearing exclusively for their youth sides up until 2011. His senior debut arrived in Primera B Nacional on 7 May 2011 against CAI, with the central midfielder starting an eventual goalless home draw; though would be substituted off at the interval. He had previously been on the bench versus San Martín a month prior. Ten appearances later, Villarreal scored in a win over All Boys on 15 November 2014; a ninetieth minute winner.

After sixty-nine matches for Independiente Rivadavia, Villarreal switched Primera B Nacional for Primera B Metropolitana after agreeing a move to Estudiantes in August 2017. His first appearance came in a scoreless draw with UAI Urquiza on 3 September, while his opening goal came almost two years later against Sacachispas on 18 May 2019; in a campaign that concluded with promotion to the second tier. Two further goals followed, in a victory over Mitre in February 2020, across twenty-three games in 2019–20. July 2020 saw Villarreal join Primera División side Aldosivi under manager Guillermo Hoyos.

Villarreal's top-flight debut occurred on 31 October 2020 in the Copa de la Liga Profesional against La Plata's Estudiantes; in a match that finished without any goals, just like his previous two club debuts did. To gain some more playing time, Villarreal was loaned out to Quilmes in July 2021 for the rest of 2022. However, the spell was cut short and he returned at the end of 2021.

In January 2022, Villarreal moved to Gimnasia Mendoza.

International career
In February 2008, Villarreal received a call-up to train with the Argentina U17s.

Career statistics
.

Notes

References

External links

1992 births
Living people
Sportspeople from Mendoza Province
Argentine footballers
Association football midfielders
Primera Nacional players
Primera B Metropolitana players
Argentine Primera División players
Independiente Rivadavia footballers
Estudiantes de Buenos Aires footballers
Aldosivi footballers
Quilmes Atlético Club footballers
Gimnasia y Esgrima de Mendoza footballers